The 2017 RAN Women’s 10s was the second edition of the ten-a-side competition and was hosted at Miramar, Florida from July 20th to the 21st. It was held over two days at Vizcaya Park and was part of Rugby Americas North (RAN) Super Week. After two rounds of competition the top two teams played each other in the finals for first place, while the bottom teams played for third. Trinidad & Tobago won the Women’s 10’s title after beating USA Rugby South 15–0 in the final.

Table

Matches

Round 1

Round 2

Finals

References 

Women's rugby union competitions for national teams
Rugby union competitions in North America
Rugby union competitions in the Caribbean
Women's rugby union in North America
2017 in North American rugby union
2017 in American rugby union